Indraprastha Gas Limited is an Indian natural gas distribution company that supplies natural gas as cooking and vehicular fuel. Established in 1998, the company operates primarily in Delhi-NCR including neighbouring cities like Noida. It is a Joint-Venture of GAIL, Bharat Petroleum, and the Government of Delhi to implement the City Gas Distribution Network.

History 
IGL was incorporated in 1998, to take over and operate the Delhi City Gas Distribution Project from GAIL for laying a network of gas distribution pipelines in Delhi. The company started as a joint venture between GAIL, Bharat Petroleum and the Govt of Delhi.

The company went public in 2003, listing on the Bombay Stock Exchange and the National Stock Exchange.

Operations
As of 31 December 2017, IGL supplied piped natural gas to over 9,00,000 homes, over 2,000 commercial and more than 1,150 industrial establishments in the NCR. It also operates 425 CNG filling stations for natural gas vehicles.

IGL sources its gas via the HVJ Gas Pipeline owned by GAIL.

References

External links 

Companies based in New Delhi
Oil and gas companies of India
Utilities of India
Energy in Delhi
Natural gas companies of India
1998 establishments in Delhi
Indian companies established in 1998
Companies listed on the National Stock Exchange of India
Companies listed on the Bombay Stock Exchange